Sackville Hamilton PC (Ire) (14 March 1732 – 29 January 1818) was an Anglo-Irish politician.

Early life
Hamilton was born on 14 March 1732.  He was the third son, of seven children born to Mary Dawson (daughter of Joshua Dawson) and Hon. Henry Hamilton, MP and Collector of the Port of Cork. His younger brother was Henry Hamilton, who served as royal Governor of Bermuda and Dominica.

His uncles were Frederick Hamilton and Gustavus Hamilton. His grandfather was Gustavus Hamilton, 1st Viscount Boyne, his great-grandfather was Sir Frederick Hamilton, and his great-great grandfather was Claud Hamilton, 1st Lord Paisley.

Career
Hamilton entered the Irish House of Commons for St Johnstown (County Longford) in 1780 and sat for the constituency until 1783. Subsequently he was elected for Rathcormack and Clogher. He chose the latter and was a Member of Parliament for the constituency until 1795, resigning the seat to be Escheator of Munster, a notional 'office of profit under the crown'. In the following year he stood successfully for Armagh Borough, which he represented until 1798.

In 1780, Hamilton was appointed Under-Secretary to the Lord Lieutenant of Ireland. He held this post until February 1795 and again from May of the same year until 1796. In 1796, he was sworn of the Privy Council of Ireland.

Personal life
He married Arabella Berkeley, daughter of Reverend Dr. Robert Berkeley, Bishop of Cloyne. Together, they were the parents of a son:

 Henry Hamilton (d. 1850), who in 1808 married Hon. Caroline Penelope Pakenham (d. 1854), a daughter of Edward Pakenham, 2nd Baron Longford, sister of Thomas Pakenham, 2nd Earl of Longford and Catherine Wellesley, Duchess of Wellington (wife of Arthur Wellesley, 1st Duke of Wellington).
 Rev. Sackville Robert Hamilton (d. 1853), the Rector at Mallow who married Jane Freeman, daughter of Edward Deane Freeman, High Sheriff of County Cork.

Hamilton died on 29 January 1818.

Descendants
Through his son Sackville, he was a grandfather of Sackville Deane Hamilton (1808–1878), who married Eleanor Sankey, and General Henry Hamilton (1812–1891), who married Isabella Freeman (a daughter of Joseph Deane Freeman).

References

1732 births
1818 deaths
Irish MPs 1776–1783
Irish MPs 1783–1790
Irish MPs 1790–1797
Members of the Privy Council of Ireland
Members of the Parliament of Ireland (pre-1801) for County Longford constituencies
Members of the Parliament of Ireland (pre-1801) for County Cork constituencies
Members of the Parliament of Ireland (pre-1801) for County Tyrone constituencies
Members of the Parliament of Ireland (pre-1801) for County Armagh constituencies
Under-Secretaries for Ireland